Zafrona pulchella is a species of sea snail, a marine gastropod mollusk in the family Columbellidae, the dove snails.

Description
The length of the shell varies between 6 mm and 12 mm.

The oblong shell is lanceolate and subturreted. It isof a whitish or reddish color, beautifully varied with simple or decussated brown spots or lines, forming sometimes a very elegant network. The spire is composed of six pretty distinct, slightly swollen whorls. Numerous longitudinal folds, slightly projecting, and crossed by decurrent striae, almost amounting to folds, can be seen at the base of the body whorl. The whitish aperture is narrow and elongated. The outer lip is rather thin and indistinctly denticulated within.

Distribution
This spêcies occurs in the Caribbean Sea, the Gulf of Mexico and off the Lesser Antilles and Puerto Rico
.

References

 Blainville (1829). Faune Française., pl. 7, fig. 4.
 Rosenberg, G.; Moretzsohn, F.; García, E. F. (2009). Gastropoda (Mollusca) of the Gulf of Mexico, pp. 579–699 in: Felder, D.L. and D.K. Camp (eds.), Gulf of Mexico–Origins, Waters, and Biota. Texas A&M Press, College Station, Texas.

External links
 

Columbellidae
Gastropods described in 1829